Maréchal is the French equivalent of English Marshal. Maréchale is the feminine form mainly used to denote the wife of a marshal in France. It can also refer to:

Military ranks 
Maréchal général des camps et armées du roi, former French distinction: Marshal General of the King's camps and armies
Maréchal d'Empire, French military distinction
Maréchal de France, French military distinction
Maréchal-des-logis, French military rank
Maréchal de camp, former French military rank

People with the surname 
Ambrose Maréchal (1764–1828), archbishop of Baltimore, Maryland
André Maréchal (b. 1916), French optician
Charles-Laurent Maréchal (1801–1887), French painter
Guillaume le Maréchal (1146–1219), English soldier and statesman
Joseph Maréchal (1878–1944), Belgian Jesuit
Leopoldo Marechal (1900–1970), Argentine poet, novelist and critic
Marion Maréchal (b. 1989), French politician
Maurice Maréchal (1892–1964), French cellist
Pierre Maréchal (1915–1949), British engineer and race driver
René-Ambroise Maréchal, French sculptor
Sylvain Maréchal (1750–1803), French essayist, poet, philosopher and political theorist

Other 
À la Maréchale, method of food preparation in classical French cuisine
Maréchal, nous voilà !, French song
  La Maréchale, founder of the Salvation Army in France and Switzerland

French-language surnames